= Disability in Papua New Guinea =

Disability in Papua New Guinea is an issue of ongoing concern, with inadequate infrastructure often limiting access to education, healthcare, employment, and other essential services for those affected. Accessibility is a major challenge, particularly for children or women with disabilities, who face barriers in accessing health services, education, public transport, and government offices. The government has recognized the rights of people with disabilities, but realizing these rights requires development of effective legal and regulatory frameworks, greater resource mobilization, and strong national cooperation and leadership.

Under the principle of "Leave no-one behind", initiatives like UN Women support the government in enhancing civic participation of people with disabilities, implementing the International Convention on the Rights of the Persons with Disability, and working towards the UN's 2030 Agenda for Sustainable Development.
